Sun City is a former census-designated place (CDP) in Riverside County, California, United States, and now a neighborhood of the city of Menifee, California. Along with the neighboring communities of Quail Valley and Menifee, it was incorporated as part of the City of Menifee on October 1, 2008. The population when Sun City was a CDP was 17,773 at the 2000 census. Sun City is located along Interstate 215 just south of the city of Perris.

As of the 2022 Census, there are 26,987 residents in Sun City, with a median age of 47. Of this, 49.17% are males and 50.83% are females. US-born citizens make up 85.81% of the resident pool in Sun City, while non-US-born citizens account for 9.77%. Additionally, 4.42% of the population is represented by non-citizens.
A total of 23,540 people in Sun City currently live in the same house as they did last year.

Sun City is a master-planned community for senior citizens over age 55. The four-square-mile residential community has one public golf course, two recreation centers with tennis courts, paddle ball courts, lawn bowling grassed courts and 2 swimming pools, 1 for enjoyment & the other primarily for laps & other water exercising (These 2 Pools are adjacent), and a commercial center consisting of Von’s & Stater Bros. supermarkets and small retail shops, full service restaurants, Pizza & Sandwich Shops (Delivery available). The laying out of the Planned Community began in 1960, making it the 2nd Retirement Community originated by Del Webb. The breaking of ground began in December of 1961. This original Sun City SoCal (Southern California) was one of the four "Sun Cities" designed hands-on by Del Webb whose Company, Del Webb Construction (www.delwebb.com) later created retirement communities in Arizona, Nevada, New Mexico, Texas, Georgia, Florida, South Carolina, North Carolina, Tennessee, Indiana, Michigan, New Jersey & Connecticut between the 1960s and the 2020s.

History 
Sun City had its origin in what is known as the Perris Valley, so known since 1885, when the community of Perris was established along the newly built Southern California Railroad certified to connect the cities of Barstow & San Diego. Until 1957, there was little change in this rural grassland valley with very few people. In 1957, Richard Rand, a land developer who hoped to promote a planned community called Ransdale, purchased the Newport Ranch. A small motel and office were as far as his plans progressed. 

In 1959, Del Webb arrived. The concept of an active retirement community was relatively new and Webb was in the process of developing the Sun City community in Arizona, which was experiencing success greater than expected. He started looking for reasonably priced land in Southern California to develop another Sun City where the Sun shined 200+ days, preferably equidistant to San Diego & Los Angeles. Webb started buying large parcels from Rand and other farmers in Menifee Valley. He ended up buying 14,000 acres from Scott Road north to Ethanac Road for $500-$900 an acre.

Timeline  
 1961: Grading was started December for Sun City with a projected opening date of June 1962.  
 1962: The Kings Inn, a new motel and restaurant, was constructed on the corner of Bradley and Cherry Hills Road. When the June opening arrived, the Civic Center was in place, along with model homes and the golf course seeded and soon to be playable. There were 100,000 visitors and 272 homes were sold in three days south of The Kings Inn. The shopping center across the street from the Kings Inn opened shortly afterwards in July 1962. The new shopping center near Highway US 395 had a Mayfair Market and Sprouse-Reitz. The first church, United Church Sun City, opens in the brand new Webb Hall of Sun City Civic Association at 26850 Sun City Blvd. The Greek outdoor theatre is also built.
 1963: The town's first gas station, a Union 76, also opens in the shopping center at the NW Corner of Bradley and Cherry Hills Blvd. Decades later, this Union 76 would be abandoned and replaced by the new Sun City Library in 2008. The Kings Inn expands with the addition of 56 rooms. Cherry Hills Golf Course opens. 
 1964: 3,500 people were living in Sun City. Security First National Bank is built in the shopping center parking plaza at Bradley near Cherry Hills Blvd. It would be torn down 2018 and replaced by a newer Sun City Library. Expansion of the Shopping Center begins with construction of a western wing. The town's 2nd gas station, Texaco, is built at 28200 Bradley Road, and is currently Bradley Auto Service.
 1965: Bank of America opens at 26800 Cherry Hills Blvd. The new west wing addition to the shopping center is officially completed. Provident Federal Savings Bank opens in this wing. Town now boasts 5,000 residents. McCall Blvd is developed and built from Sun City Blvd on west side of developing Sun City to the east side of US Hwy 395. United Church Sun City builds a church at 26701 McCall Blvd.
 1966: McCall Blvd is extended to Menifee Road east of town. Two new gas stations are built: Shell at 26730 McCall and Standard at 26980 McCall. The sole Catholic church, St. Vincent Ferrer, opens at 27931 Murrieta Road.
 1967: US Highway 395 Freeway is completed south from Ethanac to just south of the McCall Blvd exit in Sun City. This replaces Antelope Road Hwy 395. Bradley Road is also extended throughout the year to flank the east side of the shopping plaza, skirted by the newly completed US Hwy 395, and ending at Rouse Road. The Standard Gas Station opens at 26980 McCall Blvd and remains a Standard, later Chevron for over 50 year to the present day. Sun City Shell Gas opens at 26730 McCall Blvd. It is a Union 76 today. The current Sun City Gardens Retirement Community is built on the south side of town at 28500 Bradley Rd. A brick medical building opens nearby at 28401 Bradley Rd. The first mobile home park on the east side of the freeway begins construction and will become Bel Air Mobile Estates.
 1968: The current Sun City Post Office is built at 26822 Cherry Hills Blvd. A 7-Eleven opens at 27188 Sun City Blvd (currently THI Home Medical Eqp). An Arco Gas Station opens at NW Corner of 26670 McCall & Sun City Blvd. Another gas station, probably Jas White Gas Station, opens on east side of US Highway 395 at 27181 McCall Blvd. It has morphed into many different brands over the years and is now Valero.
 1969: The entire Sun City Civic Association, including the swimming pool, Greek theatre, and other amenities, is completed.
 1970: Population is now 5,519. A Mobil Gas Station opens at 26820 McCall Blvd. Sometime later in the 1970s, a Union 76 opens on the east side of the freeway at 27180 McCall Blvd. Along Encanto Road, near Romoland, a frontage road running alongside the east side of US Hwy 395 freeway, the Evans-Brown Mortuary, Canyon Ford Dealership, Sun City Convalescent Hospital, Sun City Medical Clinic, and Sun City Ambulance Service is built. These structures remain today, now housing different businesses. Also, next to the freeway, along Encanto Road, near McCall, was built some businesses, including an HR Block, a florist, and a moving company. These have since been bulldozed. 
 1971: The first homes in Sun City on the east side of US Highway 395 are built on Encanto Drive. 
 1974: Del Webb dies.
 1975: A second golf course under the Del Webb Corp, the North Golf Course, opens at 26660 McCall Blvd for a 42-year run. The Bel Air Strip Plaza is built along the frontage road (Encanto Road) alongside the freeway.
 1976: United California Bank opens at 27385 Sun City Blvd (where the current Wells Fargo is today).
 1977: Three more smaller structures added to north side of original Sun City Shopping Center for more stores. 
 1978: A fire burns down the restaurant of the Kings Inn and the inn begins a steady decline. Provident Bank opens at 27010 Sun City Blvd and is still there today. Bob's Big Boy opens at the freeway at 27990 Bradley Road. McDonalds opens next door at 28000 Bradley Road as the first fast food restaurant in town. Sun City News opens its new building at 27070 Sun City Blvd. Coast Federal Savings & Loan opens at 27190 Sun City Blvd. A second supermarket in town, Safeway, is built at 27350 Sun City Blvd. Exxon opens at 26771 McCall Blvd. A Masonic lodge opens next to the CalTex Gas Station at 27221 McCall Blvd on the east side of the freeway. The Sun City Bowl is built just east of the freeway at 27400 McCall Blvd.
 1979: The current Stater Brothers Supermarket is built on the west side of the original shopping plaza at 27160 Sun City Blvd as the third supermarket in Sun City. A fourth structure is added to the northeast side of the original Sun City Shopping Center for more stores.
 1980: Population is now 8,460. Imperial Savings Bank opens at 26960 Cherry Hills Blvd. 
 1981: A fourth supermarket, a newer Safeway, is built at 27220 Sun City Blvd. It replaces the three-year-old Safeway just a couple hundred yards to the north, and that location converts to Sprouse-Reitz, as it moves from its original location at 26932 Cherry Hills Blvd.
 1982: In nine pieces, in nine separate moves early in the morning, all the remnants of the old Kings Inn are moved to the opposite side of the freeway to 27680 Encanto Road to begin as the new Sun City Motel. By this point, the Bob's Big Boy is out of business. Construction begins on a small strip plaza at McCall Blvd & Murrieta for an opening in 1983. The old Arco Station at the northwest corner of McCall and Sun City Blvd, which had been the Sun City Car Wash in recent years, is bulldozed to make way for a new bank. Alicia's Mexican at 26750 Blvd is closed and slated to be bulldozed for another bank. It had been a Tastee Freez built in the 1970s.
 1983: Valley Bank opens at 26670 McCall Blvd (former site of the old Arco) for a 26-year span. Another building is added between the Sprouse-Reitz and Safeway to house a doughnut shop and other businesses.
 1985: The two-story Bradley Medical Building is added to the east side of the original Sun City Shopping Center.
 1986: The old Sun City Shell station is remodeled.
 1987: United Church Sun City adds an east-wing building. A series of apartment complexes begin to be built on Encanto Road east of the freeway. 
 1988: The Safeway at 27220 Sun City Blvd is converted to the current Vons Supermarket. The original Standard Station is remodeled.
 1989: The old Bobs at 27990 Bradley Road is reopened as Allie's Restaurant. 
 1990: Population is 14,390. A small strip plaza opens next to McDonald's at 27994 Bradley Rd. A Wendy's and Super 8 Motel are built on the east side of the freeway at the McCall Blvd off-ramp. 
 1992: Allie's Restaurant at 27990 Bradley Road is converted to a Coco's Restaurant. ZIP Code 92585, which had been Sun City, is now assigned to Romoland. 
 1994: The expanding Sun City Library takes over the former Security Pacific Bank at 26982 Cherry Hills Blvd. The Sprouse-Reitz closes at 27350 Sun City Blvd and becomes Thrifty Drugstore. 
 1996: Thrifty Drugstore at 27350 Sun City Blvd becomes current Rite Aid.
 2000: The population is 17,773 people.
 2001: The old abandoned Sun City Bowl is converted to a U-Haul Center.
 2003: Walgreens built on site of razed gas station, an Exxon that had existed since 1978 at 26771 McCall Blvd.
 2007: The old Union 76 Gas Station, on the east side of Interstate 215 McCall exit, is bulldozed at 27180 McCall Blvd. 
 2008: The old bank building housing the Sun City Library is demolished at 26982 Cherry Hills Blvd with a new library on site to open in 2009. The old Mobil at 26820 McCall now sits abandoned and will for many more years. The City of Menifee is incorporated as a new city through the acquisition of Menifee, Sun City, Romoland, and Quail Valley. At its time of acquisition, Sun City's population was approaching 20,000. 
 2009: The old Valley Bank closes after 26 years and is converted into a gym.
 2017: The North Golf Course closes amongst a brown landscape and old infrastructure after 42 years. The United Church Sun City is now renamed the View Church. A new fire station opens at 28349 Bradley Rd.
 2018: The old Valley Bank Building bulldozed at 26670 McCall Blvd to make room for a new Jack-in-the-Box.
 2019: The tall Union 76 Gas Station sign on east side of the Interstate 215 on McCall finally is removed, many years after the old gas station had been bulldozed.

Geography

According to the United States Census Bureau, the CDP had a total area of 7.8 square miles (20.2 km2), all of it land.

Climate
The climate in this area is described by the Köppen Climate Classification System as  "dry-summer subtropical"  often referred to as "Mediterranean" and abbreviated as Csa.

Demographics

As of the census of 2000, there were 17,773 people, 8,750 households, and 5,197 families residing in the community when it was still a CDP. The racial makeup of the CDP was 89.63% White, 2.13% African American, 0.51% Native American, 1.19% Asian, 0.15% Pacific Islander, 4.11% from other races, and 2.29% from two or more races. Hispanic or Latino of any race were 12.31% of the population.

There were 8,750 households, out of which 12.7% had children under the age of 18 living with them, 52.6% were married couples living together, 5.2% had a female householder with no husband present, and 40.6% were non-families. 37.5% of all households were made up of individuals, and 31.1% had someone living alone who was 65 years of age or older. The average household size was 1.99 and the average family size was 2.57.

In the CDP the population was spread out, with 14.2% under the age of 18, 2.6% from 18 to 24, 13.2% from 25 to 44, 18.0% from 45 to 64, and 51.9% who were 65 years of age or older. The median age was 66 years. For every 100 females there were 78.9 males. For every 100 females age 18 and over, there were 74.9 males. Sun City is renowned for a large senior citizen population, most of them are white non-Hispanic Americans. Sun City has multiple ethnic ancestral groups and the area has a sizable American Jewish community.

The median income for a household in the CDP was $29,814, and the median income for a family was $38,131. Males had a median income of $41,174 versus $29,036 for females. The per capita income for the CDP was $19,859. About 6.0% of families and 8.8% of the population were below the poverty line, including 14.4% of those under age 18 and 6.5% of those age 65 or over.

White-collar workers make up 71.59% of the working population in Sun City, while blue-collar employees account for 28.41%. There are also 969 entrepreneurs in Sun City (10.08% of the workforce); 6,690 workers employed in private companies (69.58%); and 1,546 people working in governmental institutions (16.08%).

There are a total of 11,136 households in Sun City, each made up of around 3 members. Family establishments represent 58.41% of these Sun City households, while non-family units account for the remaining 41.58%. Additionally, 20.1% of households have children and 79.9% of households are without children.

The average annual household income in Sun City is $82,505, while the median household income sits at $70,013 per year. Residents aged 25 to 44 earn $95,818, while those between 45 and 64 years old have a median wage of $77,575. In contrast, people younger than 25 and those older than 65 earn less, at $37,270 and $47,152, respectively.

There are 11,962 housing units in Sun City, and the median year in which these properties were built is 1990. Of the 11,136 occupied housing units in Sun City, 74.5% are owner-occupied, while 25.49% have renters living in them. 
Meanwhile, properties bought with mortgages account for 65.14% of the units, and the median value of a home with a mortgage is $342,650. In general, housing costs reach $1,616 per month in Sun City.

Housing Units	11,962	6.7%
Median Year Built	1990	0.0%
Built in 1939 or Earlier	186	-17.0%
Built between 1940 and 1949	64	-28.1%
Built between 1950 and 1959	425	40.7%
Built between 1960 and 1969	2,756	8.3%
Built between 1970 and 1979	2,033	6.8%
Built between 1980 and 1989	3,103	2.9%
Built between 1990 and 1999	1,410	7.8%
Built between 2000 and 2009	1,379	5.0%
Built in 2010 or Later	606	N/A

Politics

References

External links
Menifee Valley Community Portal
 Menifee 24/7 News
Menifee Valley cityhood article in the North County Times
Draft report by the Riverside County Local Agency Formation Commission on the Menifee Valley cityhood proposal PDF document

Communities in Riverside County, California
Former Census-designated places in Riverside County, California
Retirement communities
Neighborhoods in Menifee, California
1960 establishments in California